Thomas Knox Clyde (August 17, 1923 – October 1, 2005) was an American Major League Baseball pitcher. He played for the Philadelphia Athletics during the  season.

References

Major League Baseball pitchers
Philadelphia Athletics players
Baseball players from Virginia
1923 births
2005 deaths
People from Accomack County, Virginia